Gymnastics at the 1979 Pan American Games in San Juan, Puerto Rico.


Men's events

Women's events

See also
 Pan American Gymnastics Championships
 South American Gymnastics Championships
 Gymnastics at the 1980 Summer Olympics
 1979 World Artistic Gymnastics Championships

References 

1979
1979 Pan American Games